Hemelgarn Racing is an American auto racing team owned by Ron Hemelgarn. The team debuted in 1985, and competed in the CART and Indy Racing League ranks until the team originally shut down in 2010. The team returned to competition in 2015, and currently competes full-time in the USAC Silver Crown Series with driver Justin Grant. Grant won the 2020 championship for the team.

The team won the 1996 Indianapolis 500 and 2000 Indy Racing League Championship with driver Buddy Lazier.

The team had a best finish of 7th in the CART standings. Along with Lazier's Indy 500 win in 1996, the team also had two second-place finishes at the Indy 500 in 1998 and 2000.

Along with A. J. Foyt Enterprises, Hemelgarn was unique in having competed in at least one race in every season of the Indy Racing League's existence from 1996 through 2008.

CART series history

Early years
The team was founded in 1985 and participated part-time in the CART series with largely outdated equipment and three different drivers. In 1986 the team bought new March chassis and participated full-time with Jacques Villeneuve and part-time with Scott Brayton, putting both in the field of the team's first Indianapolis 500.

Arie Luyendyk replaced Villeneuve for 1987 and finished 7th in points. In 1988 Scott Brayton raced full-time for the team while three other drivers fielded part-time entries. For 1989, seven different drivers took turns behind the wheel, as the team struggled to find consistency. Buddy Lazier first joined the team in 1990 and competed in his first six CART races with the team. Lazier was bumped from the field and failed to qualify for the Indianapolis 500, while Billy Vukovich III did qualify his Hemelgarn machine for the 1990 Indy 500, finishing 24th in a two-year-old Lola-Buick.

1991
Hemelgarn teamed up with Dale Coyne Racing to field a car at Road America and Toronto for Lazier in 1991. The team fielded three cars at the 1991 Indianapolis 500. Indy legend Gordon Johncock, veteran Stan Fox, and Buddy Lazier, who made the race for the first time. Lazier was involved in a spin on the first lap and finished last. Johncock, however, charged from 33rd starting position, and battling an illness, came home in a surprising 6th place. Fox in 8th place gave the team two cars in the top ten.

1992-1995
In 1992 the team only participated at Indianapolis as costs to run the series full-time increased rapidly. In 1993 the team fielded a car for pay driver Brian Bonner in a pair of road races.

For 1994 and 1995, Hemelgarn ran Indianapolis only, with veteran Stan Fox as the primary driver. Jeff Andretti (1994) and Jim Crawford (1995), respectively, were entered as second drivers, but neither were able to qualify. Fox was running in the top ten late in the race in 1994, but spun out and crashed in turn one with four laps to go. In 1995 Fox qualified 11th, but was involved in a terrible crash at the start. He was critically injured, suffering a closed-head injury, which ended his driving career.

Indy Racing League success

1996-2001
With the founding of the Indy Racing League in 1996, the team was eager to return to full-time racing and re-signed former Hemelgarn stalwart Buddy Lazier to pilot their full-time entry and fielded additional cars for Brad Murphey and Stéphan Grégoire in the Indy 500.

Buddy Lazier scored the team's first pole position at the 1996 IRL season opener at Walt Disney World Speedway.

Lazier scored the first win of his Indy car career and Hemelgarn's first as a team in a gutsy drive while recovering from a back injury in the 1996 Indianapolis 500. This win cemented Lazier and sponsor Delta Faucet with the team for years to come. Lazier was one of the top drivers in the league, consistently scoring top-tens and finishing in the top-ten in points every year.

In 2000, Lazier and Hemelgarn captured the Indy Racing League championship and finished second in the Indy 500 behind the dominant "500" rookie Juan Pablo Montoya. The team nearly repeated their championship ways in 2001, with Lazier capturing four wins and finishing second in points, albeit well back from champion Sam Hornish Jr.

With Lazier behind the wheel, Hemelgarn posted eight wins, and 18 top three finishes over six seasons.

Struggles and closure

2002-2005
As 2002 came, the team began to struggle. The influx of former CART teams had begun and Lazier only managed an 8th-place finish in points and only registered a pair of top five finishes. 2003 was even worse as the team struggled with under-powered Chevrolet engines compared to the new Honda and Toyota powerplants and Lazier finished a dismal 19th in series points, prompting Delta Faucets to leave the team.

In 2004 the team was only able to field a car for Lazier in the Indy 500. In 2005 the team returned to full-time competition with new ethanol sponsorship brought by driver Paul Dana who was injured after three races and replaced by Jimmy Kite.

2006

The team hit rock bottom in 2006. The team was able to broker a deal with driver P. J. Chesson, with financial backing from NBA star Carmelo Anthony. Jeff Bucknum joined the team as a second team car, and under the moniker "Car-Melo", the two cars qualified for the 2006 Indianapolis 500. On the second lap, however, the two cars tangled in turn two and crashed out together, finishing 32nd and 33rd (last and second-to-last). Following the devastating result, Ron Hemelgarn let his crew go and suspended the team's operations, leaving Chesson without a ride for the rest of the year.

2007-2009
It was unknown if and when Hemelgarn Racing would return to the track until the team filed an entry for the 2007 Indianapolis 500. Little was heard of the entry until a deal was put together on the Friday before the final weekend of qualifying with Racing Professionals to jointly field a former Hemelgarn chassis (bought by RP) for Richie Hearn. Hearn solidly put the car in the field after only 26 laps of practice on Bump Day and finished the race in the 23rd position.

In 2008 Buddy Lazier returned to the team for the Indianapolis 500 and made a last minute run on Bump Day to put the car into the field. With little practice, Lazier struggled with the handling of the car and finished 17th five laps down. The team attempted to repeat 2008's relative success in 2009, but despite running lap times similar to what they had run the previous year, Lazier was not able to wring enough speed from the car to make the field.

In April 2010, SPEED TV's Robin Miller reported that Hemelgarn Racing had ceased operations.

Return (2015-present)
The team reopened at the start of 2015, and began competing full-time in the USAC Silver Crown Series. Austin Nemire raced for the team in 2015 and 2016. Nemire had two top 5s (Iowa - 2015 and Gateway - 2016), and finished 8th in points standings during both seasons. 

Hemelgarn joined forces with Chris Carli Motorsports & driver Justin Grant for the 2017 season. The combination had success as they finished 4th in the points standings & won the Bettenhausen 100 at Illinois State Fairgrounds.

Grant returned to the team for the 2018 season and won at Terre Haute Action Track. Grant won the 2020 championship without winning a race that season.

List of Hemelgarn drivers

CART
 Brian Bonner 1993
 Scott Brayton 1986–1989
 Stan Fox 1991–1995
 Spike Gehlhausen 1985
 Scott Goodyear 1989–1990
 Davey Hamilton 1991; 1995
 Ludwig Heimrath 1988–1989
 Gordon Johncock 1988–1989; 1991–1992
 Ken Johnson 1988
 Buddy Lazier 1990–1991; 1994
 Arie Luyendyk 1987
 Enrique Mansilla 1985
 Tero Palmroth 1989
 Michael Roe 1985
 Dick Simon (sponsored car) 1978–1979
 Tom Sneva 1988–1989
 Didier Theys 1989
 Robby Unser 1989
 Jacques Villeneuve 1986
 Rich Vogler 1987
 Billy Vukovich III 1989–1990

IndyCar / Indy Racing League
 Jeff Bucknum 2006
 P. J. Chesson 2006
 Paul Dana 2005
 Stephan Gregoire 1996
 Richie Hearn 2003, 2007
 Jimmy Kite 2005
 Buddy Lazier 1996–2003; 2008
 Chris Menninga 2001
 Brad Murphey 1996–1997
 Lyn St. James 1997
 Johnny Unser 1997–1999
 Stan Wattles 2000–2001

USAC Silver Crown Series
 Justin Grant 2017-present
 Austin Nemire 2015-2016

Complete Racing Results

Complete PPG CART Indycar World Series results
(key)

IRL/IndyCar Series
(key) (Results in bold indicate pole position; results in italics indicate fastest lap)

  The 1999 VisionAire 500K at Charlotte was cancelled after 79 laps due to spectator fatalities.
  In conjunction with Racing Professionals.

References

External links
 Official Site

IndyCar Series teams
American auto racing teams
Champ Car teams
Indy Lights teams
2010 disestablishments in the United States